Neville Colman (July 30, 1945 – February 11, 2003) was a hematologist and forensic DNA expert who made ground-breaking discoveries about folate and nutrition. He also founded the West Side Soccer League, the largest all-volunteer sports organization in New York City. There is a sports field named after him in NYC's Riverside Park.

Early life
Colman was born in Germiston, South Africa, and attended the University of the Witwatersrand, where he received doctorates in medicine and pathology, as well as a masters in nuclear medicine. He was also described as an "outstanding athlete". He left South Africa in 1974, due to his opposition to the apartheid regime, and emigrated to the United States.

Medical career
Colman was chief of diagnostic pathology and clinical medicine for Continuum Health Partners, including St. Luke's–Roosevelt Hospital Center (now Mount Sinai West) and Beth Israel Hospital. He was also a professor and vice chairman of pathology at Columbia University's College of Physicians and Surgeons. Prior to working at St. Luke's-Roosevelt, he was the head of the Center for Clinical Laboratories at Mount Sinai Hospital.

Colman is credited with ground-breaking research on folate. During his doctoral research at the University of Witwatersrand, he discovered that the anemia suffered in many rural communities under attack from apartheid was caused by a folate deficiency. His research eventually led to the fortification of food products with folic acid, which is endorsed by the World Health Organization and the United States Food and Drug Administration. For much of his medical career, he worked closely with Victor Herbert on folate research.

He also developed a technique for delivering supplementary vitamin B-12 with a nasal gel to those with Crohn's disease.

Colman also worked extensively in the area of DNA research, calling for increased standards in its use as a forensic tool. Throughout the 1980s, he collaborated with attorney Peter Neufeld on work about the proper use of new scientific techniques in criminal cases. Colman frequently provided expert testimony in criminal cases on the veracity of DNA fingerprinting and quality control in criminology laboratories. Colman and Neufeld identified a problem with the lax regulation of crime laboratories, noting "there is more regulation of clinical laboratories  that determine whether one has mononucleosis than there is of forensic laboratories able to produce DNA test results that can help send a person to the electric chair."  In 1990, Colman and Neufeld summed up this work in an article in Scientific American, which was reprinted in numerous textbooks. The National Research Council of the National Academy of Sciences released their own policy on rigor and oversight in forensic science two years later.

Other activities

Political
Before emigrating to the United States, Colman was active in the anti-apartheid movement in South Africa. He assisted in the making of two documentaries about apartheid, End of the Dialogue and Last Grave at Dimbaza, which were filmed secretly by British film students, and conceived by members of the Pan Africanist Congress in exile in London. Colman was also active in the National Union of South African Students, and was a member of the Liberal Party of South Africa until it was banned by the South African government in 1968.

Colman left South Africa in 1974, due to his opposition to the apartheid regime, and emigrated to the United States. His experience is featured in The Rift, Hilda Bernstein's book on South African exiles. Bernstein interviewed Colman in New York City, and the interview is on file at the University of the Witwatersrand Historical Papers Research Archive.

West Side Soccer League
In 1987, Colman founded the West Side Soccer League. He was the league's regional commissioner from 1987 to 1996. He went on to become New York area director of the American Youth Soccer Organization. According to one source, Colman grew up playing soccer in South Africa and worked to educate American parents who had no soccer experience about the game. In 2005, after Colman's death, a sports field in Riverside Park was named Neville Colman Field in honor of his contributions to youth soccer in New York City.

Death
Colman died in 2003 in New York City. The cause of death was metastasized gastric cancer.

Selected publications

References

1945 births
2003 deaths
American hematologists
Jewish South African anti-apartheid activists
People from Germiston
South African Jews
South African people of Russian-Jewish descent
University of the Witwatersrand alumni
White South African anti-apartheid activists